Rinku Ghosh is an Indian television and film actress. She is known for her work in the T.V. serial  Durgesh Nandini (2007) and films such as  Daroga Babu I Love You  (2004),  Bidai  (2008) and  Balidaan  (2009). She has performed in Hindi, Telugu, Bengali and Bhojpuri films. Among other accolades, she won Best Actress in the 2008 Bhojpuri Film Awards.

Early Life

Rinku Ghosh was born on 30th August, 1981 in Kerala, India in a Bengali Hindu family. Her father Mr. Durgadas Ghosh is a retired Ex-Navy Officer who served Indian Navy for several years and her Mother Late Mrs. Chanda Ghosh was a home maker. She also has a younger sibling. Her younger sister was studious whereas Rinku Ghosh was not much inclined towards her academics. However, since her childhood she took great interest in art related fields such as dance and drama.

She is Distinction holder in Bharat natyam and holds a degree (Veesharad) in the same as well. She started her career in TVC's such as Medimix, Rexona, Kelvinator etc and post this she further explored the film industry and Television industry.

Career

Television serials

Rinku Ghosh's first television role was on the serial Durgesh Nandinii as a lead actress which was telecast on Sony TV in 2007. She was next seen in Mohe Rang De as the main antagonist. She was also known for her performance in Ek Safar Aisa Kabhi Socha Na Tha in 2009. In 2012, she appeared in Dhaniya Ka Thana which was aired on Anjan TV. In 2013, she played the role of Mohini Faujdar in the sitcom Mrs. Pammi Pyarelal on Colors TV and in Imtihaan in 2010. Later in 2018 she appeared as a celebrity judge for the show Big Memsaab on Big Ganga Channel and in 2021, she was a celebrity judge for Memsaab No 1 which was telecast on Zee Ganga.

Filmography

Rinku Ghosh made her film debut in the 2000 Bengali film Jai Maa Durga, in which she was cast opposite Deboshree Roy, Arun Govil and Abhishek Chatterjee. She made her Telugu debut in Raave Na Chaliya with Sai Kiran as a co-actor in 2001. In 2002, she was seen in a Hindi film Bharat Bhagya Vidhata (as Sapna). The year 2003 saw her multiple film releases such as Hindi film Tumse Milke Wrong Number and Koi Hai. She did her first Bhojpuri Motion Picture in the film Suhagan Bana Sajna Hamaar in 2004. In 2005, she worked in the Hindi film titled Mumbai Godfather. She then appeared in Daroga Babu I Love You, "Balidaan", "Saat Saheliyan", "Rakhwala", and "Nagina".

Special appearance

Web series 

Rinku Ghosh stars in the Hindi web series Patra Petika in 2022.

Awards and nominations

Rinku Ghosh won the Best Actress Award in 2008 for the film Bidai in the Fourth Bhojpuri Film Awards, among other awards for the same role. In the same year she was nominated for the Critics Award for Durgesh Nandini in the Indian Television Academy Awards. In the Bhojpuri Film Awards, she won Best Actress for Balidan in 2009.

See also
 List of Bhojpuri cinema actresses

References

External links
 
 

Actresses from West Bengal
Living people
Actresses in Bhojpuri cinema
Indian television actresses
Actresses in Telugu cinema
Actresses in Hindi cinema
Indian film actresses
21st-century Indian actresses
Year of birth missing (living people)